Cîrligați may refer to:

 Călmățuiu, commune in Teleorman County, Romania
 Pădureni, Vaslui, Romania

See also 
 Cârlig (disambiguation)
 Cârligi (disambiguation)
 Cârligei (disambiguation)
 Cârligu River (disambiguation)
 Cârligele River (disambiguation)